Sir James Richard Samuel Morris  (20 November 1925 – 1 July 2008), also known as Dick Morris, was a British engineer and industrialist.

Richard Morris was born in London, the son of a banker. He was a boy chorister at All Souls, Langham Place, and was educated at Ardingly College. He began to train to be a doctor, before changing career and serving in the Welsh Guards, rising to Captain, and served in Palestine (region) as Israel was being created. He received a bachelor's degree in Chemical Engineering from the University of Birmingham.

Morris worked for Courtaulds for almost 30 years, and then various other companies.

References

1925 births
2008 deaths
People educated at Ardingly College
Alumni of the University of Birmingham
Commanders of the Order of the British Empire
Knights Bachelor
Businesspeople awarded knighthoods
British chemical engineers
British industrialists
People named in the Panama Papers
Presidents of the Association for Science Education
Engineers from London